The Halle-Vilvoorde Arrondissement is one of the two administrative arrondissements in the Belgian province of Flemish Brabant. It almost completely surrounds the Brussels-Capital Region and lies to the west of the other arrondissement in the province, the Leuven Arrondissement. Unlike the Arrondissement of Leuven, it is not a judicial arrondissement; however since the sixth Belgian state reform in 2012–14, it has its own public prosecutor's service.

The Halle-Vilvoorde Arrondissement and the Brussels-Capital Region together formed the Brussels-Halle-Vilvoorde electoral district and the Judicial Arrondissement of Brussels. Following the 2007 federal election, Yves Leterme, who is in charge of the negotiations for forming a new Federal Government, proposed to split up the Judicial Arrondissement of Brussels into two judicial arrondissements: one comprising Halle-Vilvoorde and the other comprising the Brussels Region.

History

The Arrondissement of Halle-Vilvoorde was established in 1963 when the language borders were determined. At that time, the then Administrative Arrondissement of Brussels, which had the same territory as the present-day Judicial Arrondissement of Brussels, was split into three administrative arrondissements, two of which still exist today:
Brussels-Capital, which consists of the 19 municipalities of the Brussels Region;
Halle-Vilvoorde, a unilingual Dutch-speaking administrative arrondissement;
Brussels-Periphery, which consisted of the six Flemish municipalities with language facilities for French-speakers around Brussels.

On January 1, 1971, the Arrondissement of Brussels-Periphery ceased to exist and its municipalities were added to Halle-Vilvoorde.

In 1977, the then municipality of Muizen ceased to exist and was ceded to the Arrondissement of Mechelen, in the Province of Antwerp.

Municipalities

The Administrative Arrondissement of Halle-Vilvoorde is made up of the following municipalities:

 Affligem
 Asse
 Beersel
 Bever
 Dilbeek
 Drogenbos
 Galmaarden
 Gooik
 Grimbergen
 Halle
 Herne
 Hoeilaart

 Kampenhout
 Kapelle-op-den-Bos
 Kraainem
 Lennik
 Liedekerke
 Linkebeek
 Londerzeel
 Machelen
 Meise
 Merchtem
 Opwijk
 Overijse

 Pepingen
 Roosdaal
 Sint-Genesius-Rode
 Sint-Pieters-Leeuw
 Steenokkerzeel
 Ternat
 Vilvoorde
 Wemmel
 Wezembeek-Oppem
 Zaventem
 Zemst

Population
Population as of 1 January in recent years:

See also
 Brussels Periphery (Vlaamse Rand)

Halle-Vilvoorde